Vernati is a surname of Italian origin. Notable people with the surname include:

 Marisa Vernati (1920–1988), Italian actress
 Sirio Vernati (1907–1993), Swiss footballer

See also
Vernate (disambiguation)

Italian-language surnames